Leptopterna ferrugata is a species of plant bug in the family Miridae. It is found in Europe  to the east to Siberia and in the south to the northern Mediterranean basin and to Asia Minor. It is an adventive species in North America.

References

Further reading

External links

 

Articles created by Qbugbot
Insects described in 1807
Stenodemini
Taxa named by Carl Fredrik Fallén